Campina Grande is the second most populous Brazilian city in the State of Paraíba after João Pessoa, the capital. It is considered to be the most important city of the Northeastern Brazilian subregion called agreste. It is considered one of the main industrial, technological and educational centers in the northeastern region of Brazil. The city was officially founded in 1864.  Campina Grande also has a large cultural agenda, including the world's largest Saint John's Festival (called O Maior São João do Mundo), which takes place during the entire month of June.

History

Origin
The founding of Campina Grande is credited to Captain Teodósio de Oliveira Ledo who led a group of Ariús Indians to settle the land and begin farming on December 1, 1697. However, some historians do not agree with this version and suggest that the place was already a settlement and named Campina Grande when Teodósio arrived with the Ariús. This position is certainly supported by the fact that Campina Grande is in a critical geographic location for people travelling between the highlands and the coast.

The political actions of Teodósio in mentioning Campina Grande to the king of Portugal in May 1699 went a long way to establishing the location as place of importance.

The Ariús inhabited a small farm made up of shacks which became the first street in the new community. Later, this street was called Rua do Oriente (Street of the East) and today it is known as rua Vila Nova da Rainha (New Village of the Queen). The Cathedral of Campina Grande was constructed on one of the higher slopes in the area. It formed the Matriz plaza which later also became one of city's most important streets: Avenida Marechal Floriano Peixoto.

The village soon became a town because of the commerce it attracted and the fact that there were few settlements in Paraíba.

Campina Grande began as a small village situated in front of an old lake called Açude Velho. These people were known as tropeiros because they were traveling merchants who traded and sold goods such as meat, cotton clothes and corn flour among the cities and villages they passed by.  Campina Grande became the village (Vila Nova da Rainha) that they rested in as they were coming from the coast to the west, and vice versa.

The introduction of the railroad caused this tiny village to develop into a bustling city. At the beginning of the 20th century, Campina Grande was called "The Brazilian Liverpool" because of the numerous cotton plantations and factories.  At the time, it was the second biggest producer in the world.

Today, the city has added to its old and rich traditions by becoming an oasis of high technologies in the middle of northeastern Brazil.

The town

Campina Grande reached the category of town in 1790 with more than 100 houses.  On April 6, 1790, it changed its name to de Vila Nova da Rainha (New Village of the Queen). At this point the town also began to have a formal government made up of a town council and Notary's office.

Although the name of the town changed, the local inhabitants continued to call the place Campina Grande.  However, in official documents the name, de Vila Nova da Rainha, was the only one used.

The town's development was spurred on by the growth of the regional cotton industry which preferred to ship its product through Campina Grande.

At this point the town included a large area of almost ,including many smaller villages in the area.

The creation of the Village of Cabaceiras in 1835 and the Village of Alagoa Nova in 1850 reduced the area Campina Grande controlled.

In 1829, a dam across the Piabas stream was started and this became the lake referred to as Açude Velho. In 1852 the population of the town had reached 17,900 people, but in 1856, an epidemic killed almost 1,550 people.  So many bodies arrived at the churches that they didn't have enough room to bury them.

The city

On October 11, 1864, Campina Grande was raised to the category of city. It was not the first to reach this designation though.  In 1846, Areia had been designated a city and dominated the region economically, politically and culturally. Although Campina Grande was not as established as Areia, it was really not any smaller than that city. At this time, the city of Campina Grande had three plazas, four streets and about 300 houses. Of these, there still exist today the two churches: the Matriz (the cathedral) and the Church of Our Lady of the Rosary. The latter had been destroyed at one time, but was rebuilt. Although there was plenty of commercial activity, there was very little actual construction of houses and government buildings.  By the end of the nineteenth century, Campina Grande still only had about 500 houses.

In the year 1864 a building was constructed for the marketing of goods. This area had many names over time: "Largo do Comércio Novo", "Praça da Uruguaiana", "Praça das Gameleiras", "Praça da Independência" and finally, "Praça Epitácio Pessoa". In 1870 a law banning the washing of clothes and animals in Açude Velho was proclaimed. On September 18, 1865, the metric system was made the official form of measurement in Campina Grande.

In 1874, a rebellion led by João Vieira occurred. João Vieira and a number of revolutionaries came down from the Bodopitá mountain range and invaded the city's market. They broke into some money boxes and destroyed a few things. The revolt spread out across the region. Over time the rebels grew in numbers and became well armed. They were led by Manoel de Barros Souza and Alexandre de Viveiros. One of the objectives of Alexandre de Viveiros was to break into the city jail and liberate all the prisoners, including the father of Manoel de Barros Souza. They also planned to set the municipal offices on fire in order to destroy all the records kept there. However, over the next number of months the police force disrupted their plans. Alexandre de Viveiros was eventually imprisoned, but João Vieirad disappeared. After the revolt, the police abused the population without cause, arresting or punishing innocent citizens. Thus, the average person suffered both from the rebels and the police.

On March 25, 1877, a new municipal building was constructed next to the cathedral.  It became one of the most elegant buildings in the state and initiated an area of fine homes.

In May 1891, a theatre was constructed for the purpose of both teaching and performance. This became the Colégio Alfredo Dantas.

The city continued to gradually develop, but economic and social changes really occurred only from the early  20th century. In this period, the railroad arrived and with it came cheaper and more varied products which impacted the local economy.

Technological centre
For a long time Campina Grande has had a strong technological focus. In 1967, the city was the first location in northeastern Brazil to receive a computer (at the Federal University of Campina Grande). Today, Campina Grande is a point of reference when it comes software development and computer science industries.

In April 2001, Newsweek magazine chose nine cities around the world that represented a new vision for technology. Brazil is represented on this list by Campina Grande and it was the only city chosen from Latin America. In 2003, it was mentioned again as the “Brazilian Silicon Valley,"

The reason for this success is mostly due to technological research performed by the Federal University of Campina Grande. Since 1967, when the university obtained support to buy its first computer for US$500,000, the city has developed a tradition of technological excellence that is recognized around the world.

Campina Grande has approximately 50 software companies that contribute about 20% of the city's total revenue.

Main sights
Libraries
 Felix Araújo Municipal Library
 Açude Velho Public Library
 Campina Grande Public Library
 Cultural Centres
 Academia Campinense de Letras
Museums
 Historical and Geographic museum of Campina Grande
 Assis Chateaubriand Museum of Art
 Museum of Cotton
 Museum of Luiz Gonzaga
 Museum of St. John
 Assis Chateaubriand Museum
 Home Marshal Anderson
Squares and parks
 Flag Square
 Clementino Procópio Square
 Açude Novo (New Dam)
 Açude Velho (Old Dam)
 Bodocongó Dam
 People's Park – Where the St. John's festival (O Maior São João do Mundo) is held
 Park of the Child
Theatres
 Severino Bezerra Cabral Municipal Theatre
 Elba Ramalho Theatre
 Rosil Cavalcanti Theatre
 Facisa Theatre
 Raul Priston Theatre
 Ariano Suassuna Theatre

Culture
Events in Campina Grande include:
Meeting for the Christian Conscience  (February, during Carnival)
Meeting of the New Conscience (February, during Carnival)
Vaquejada Park Ivandro Cunha Lima (March)
Micarande (April)
St. John's Festival (O Maior São João do Mundo, June)
Campina Grande Winter Festival (August)
Vaquejada Park Maria da Luz (October)
Animal Exposition (October)
Living Christmas Cradle (December)
New Year's Eve on Açude Velho (December)

Transportation
 Presidente João Suassuna Airport
 Argemiro de Figueiredo Bus Station – New
 Cristiano Lauritzen Bus Station – Old

Education

Post-secondary education
 Federal University of Campina Grande – UFCG
 State University of Paraíba – UEPB
 Campina Grande Union of Secondary Education – UNESC (private)
 College of Applied Social Sciences – FACISA (private)
 Reinaldo Ramos Center of Secondary Education – CESREI (private)
 Acaraú Valley University – U.V.A. (private)
 English-American College (private)

Sports
Sport and recreation structures in Campina Grande include:
 Plínio Lemos Sports Complex
 The Meninão Gymnasium
 Amigão Stadium
 Renatão Stadium home stadium of the Campinense Clube
 President Vargas Stadium, home stadium of the Treze Futebol Clube

Local teams include:
 Campinense Clube
 Treze Futebol Clube
 Grêmio Serrano
 Associação Desportiva Perilima
 Associação Atlética Leonel

Neighborhoods

Acácio Figueiredo
Alto Branco
Araxá
Bairro das Cidades
Bairros das Nações
Bela Vista
Bodocongó
Cachoeira
Araxá
Castelo Branco
Catolé
Centenário
Centro
Conceição
Cruzeiro
Cuités
Dinamérica
Distrito Industrial
Estação Velha
Glória
Itararé
Jardim Borborema
Jardim Continental
Jardim Paulistano
Jardim Tavares
Jeremias
José Pinheiro
Lauritzen
Liberdade
Louzeiro
Malvinas
Mirante
Monte Castelo
Monte Santo
Nova Brasília
Novo Bodocongó
Palmeira
Pedregal
Prata
Presidente Médice
Quarenta
Ramadinha
Sandra Cavalcante
Santa Cruz
Santa Rosa
Santo Antônio
São José
Serrotão
Tambor
Três Irmãs
Universitário
Velame
Vila Cabral

Economy
According to 1996 statistics from the Instituto de Pesquisa Econômica Aplicada, the Gross Internal Product was  estimated at R$591.93 million: 3.3% came through agricultural and livestock based activities, 19.8% came through industry, and 76.9% was the result of the commerce and service sectors.  The yield per capita was of R$1.717.09.

By 2002 the Brazilian Institute of Geography and Statistics estimated that the Gross Internal Product to have grown to R$1.600 billion and the yield per capita to R$4,387.00.

Local government

Campina Grande has 255,282 eligible voters distributed among 598 sections and four electoral districts.

The first election in 1878 had 34 eligible voters.

The office of Municipal mayor was created on March 2, 1895, by State Law. The first mayor  of Campina Grande was  Francisco Camilo of Araújo. People began to have the opportunity to vote for the mayor directly only from 1947.

Statistics

Education

 Illiteracy rate: 17.12%.

HDI

Urban sanitation

Health
 2,634 hospital beds of which 2,148 are for free public health .
 Infant mortality: 76.6 persons/million .
 Life expectancy: 63.5 years .

Distances

Geography

Flora

A list of 15 plants commonly found in the Campina Grande area. Of the 132 species of trees found, 51.2% originate from other countries and 32.8% are native species.

Climate

Campina Grande has a dry-summer tropical savanna climate (Köppen: As) that borders on a hot semi-arid climate (Köppen: BSh).

Notable people
 Bethe Correia, mixed martial artist
 Hulk, footballer
Renan da Silva Costa, footballer 
Thaciano, footballer
Aderbar Melo dos Santos Neto, footballer
Mike Deodato, Comic Book Artist
Juliette Freire, singer

References

 
Populated places established in 1864
Municipalities in Paraíba